Abby Roberts is a British make up artist, musician, and TikTok influencer.

References

2000s births
Living people
British musicians
British TikTokers